The Boston City Club (est.1906) of Boston, Massachusetts focused on "the city of Boston and the problems of its growth." Founders included Louis D. Brandeis, Edward Filene, and Edmund Billings.

References

Further reading
 Address of the Hon. Samuel J. Elder at a dinner given in his honor by the Boston City Club at the Club House, April 23, 1914.

External links

 Boston Public Library. Boston City Club Collection.

1906 establishments in Massachusetts
Clubs and societies in Boston
20th century in Boston
Beacon Hill, Boston